WMXE  (100.9 FM) is a classic hits formatted broadcast radio station licensed to South Charleston, West Virginia, serving Charleston and Kanawha County, West Virginia.  Programming is also simulcast on 102.3 FM WWQB in Westwood, Kentucky, which serves Huntington, West Virginia. WMXE is owned and operated by L.M. Communications, Inc.

External links
Mix 100.9 Online

MXE